Bencha railway station is a railway station in Rudong County, Nantong, Jiangsu, China. It is an intermediate station on the Hai'an–Yangkou Port railway. The station was opened on 16 January 2014. It has a passenger service and a single freight siding.

References

Railway stations in Jiangsu
Railway stations in China opened in 2014